Fernando Andrés Cornejo Jiménez (January 28, 1969 – January 24, 2009) was a Chilean football midfielder. He died of stomach cancer on January 24, 2009, four days before his 40th birthday.

Club career
He played domestically for O'Higgins, Cobreloa and Universidad Católica.

International career
He was capped 33 times and scored 2 goals for the Chile national team between 1991 and 2000, including two games at the 1998 FIFA World Cup. In addition, he played for Chile B against England B on February 10, 1998. Chile won by 2-1.

Career statistics

International goals

Personal life
He is the father of the professional footballer Fernando Cornejo Miranda. 

He was nicknamed Corazón de Minero (Miner's Heart) due to the fact that he was a notable player of Cobreloa, a club based in Calama highly related with the copper mining.

Honours

Club
Cobreloa
 Primera División de Chile (4): 1992, 2003–A, 2003–C, 2004–C

References

External links

Cancer Diagnosis at Cooperativa.cl
Health Status at Cooperativa.cl
Death at La Tercera

1969 births
2009 deaths
Deaths from stomach cancer
Deaths from cancer in Chile
People from Rengo
Chilean footballers
Chile international footballers
O'Higgins F.C. footballers
Cobreloa footballers
Club Deportivo Universidad Católica footballers
Chilean Primera División players
1998 FIFA World Cup players
Association football midfielders
People from Cachapoal Province
People from O'Higgins Region